Piritramide(R-3365, trade names Dipidolor, Piridolan, Pirium and others) is a synthetic opioid analgesic (narcotic painkiller) that is marketed in certain European countries including: Austria, Belgium, Czech Republic, Slovenia,  Germany and the Netherlands. It comes in free form, is about 0.75x times as potent as morphine and is given parenterally (by injection) for the treatment of severe pain. Nausea, vomiting, respiratory depression and constipation are believed to be less frequent with piritramide than with morphine (the gold standard opioid against which other opioids are compared and contrasted), and it produces more rapid-onset analgesia (pain relief) when compared to morphine and pethidine. After intravenous administration the onset of analgesia is as little as 1–2 minutes, which may be related to its great lipophilicity. The analgesic and sedative effects of piritramide are believed to be potentiated with phenothiazines and its emetic (nausea/vomiting-inducing) effects are suppressed. The volume of distribution is 0.7-1 L/kg after a single dose, 4.7-6 L/kg after steady-state concentrations are achieved and up to 11.1 L/kg after prolonged dosing.

Piritramide was developed and patented in Belgium, at Janssen, in 1960.  It is part of an eponymous two-member class of opioids in clinical use with the other being bezitramide (Burgodin).  The closest chemical and structural relatives of piritramide in clinical use include the diphenoxylate family, fentanyl (both Janssen discoveries) and somewhat more distantly alphaprodine.

Not being in clinical use in the United States, it is a Schedule I Narcotic controlled substance with a DEA ACSCN of 9642 and manufacturing quota of zero.

Synthesis
This same sidechain is also used in the synthesis of: Bezitramide, Diphenoxylate, Imidafenacin & others.
This same piperidine is also used in the synthesis of: Carpipramine, Clocapramine, Mosapramine & Pipamperone.

The last step in the synthesis consists of attachment of the sidechain by an Sn2 alkylation between 4-bromo-2,2-diphenylbutanenitrile [39186-58-8] (1) and 1,4'-bipiperidine-4'-carboxamide [39633-82-4] (2) catalyzed by KI (Finkelstein reaction) in the presence of sodium carbonate base and in anhydrous toluene solvent yielding  (3)..

References 

Opioids
Piperidines
Carboxamides
Nitriles
Mu-opioid receptor agonists
Janssen Pharmaceutica
Belgian inventions